The Future Commando Force (FCF) is an in-progress (as of February 2022) modernisation programme and model of the future role and operations of the Royal Marines. The FCF essentially retasks 40 Commando and 45 Commando with implementing the infantry component of two Littoral Response Groups (LRGs), though other units from 3 Commando Brigade are also included in the composition of LRGs, as well as changing the role and operations of the Royal Marines and the equipment and tactics they use. The FCF concept was created before 2019, when the first exercises and experiments with the FCF began. It was reinforced in the Defence in a Competitive Age command paper, which followed the Integrated Review. It describes the Royal Marines as a forward-deployed maritime special operations/special operations capable force which will work with greater agility and autonomy, and in smaller teams that specialise in raids within littoral zones, and operations within grey zones and other special operations to relieve and complement United Kingdom Special Forces (UKSF). The emphasis on the littoral role of the Royal Marines strongly links the FCF to the Littoral Strike concept, which is being developed and implemented by the LRGs. The FCF is also strongly linked to the "Autonomous Advanced Force" concept by its emphasis on leveraging new technologies to augment commandos on operations. A series of exercises from 2019–present (as of November 2021) have been key to developing the FCF, chiefly with experimentation.

Concept

Given that the FCF programme is ongoing, its form has not been finalised, and is subject to change. Currently, it models the Royal Marines as a new special operations/special operations capable maritime force. This force is to be expeditionary, provide a rapid response ability, and able work in littoral zones and grey zones. Moreover, the FCF was created, in part, to counter coastal A2AD systems. Specialising in raids, the FCF will also be capable in Security force assistance/Foreign internal defense, and other operations that could potentially fall under special operations, in order to relieve UKSF of some of their mission set, allowing them to better focus on the tasks of greatest importance.

The FCF programme has seen an increased focus on using technology to augment Royal Marine commandos, including tactical tablet kits, drones such as small Remotely Piloted Aircraft Systems (RPAS) and cargo drones, throwbots, and AI-enabled autonomous systems. Autonomous systems using AI technologies such as computer vision will also connect in mesh networks and MANETs to supply ISTAR to the Royal Marines in a single integrated platform. These new technologies are used to increase the effectivenes and lethality of Royal Marines, while modern C4ISR/C5I equipment is used to enable more agile and decentralised operations and integrated with autonomous systems to inform and assist decision-making and commando operations, in keeping with the Royal Navy's wider Advanced Autonomous Force concept.

The renewal of equipment extends into new clothing and personal weapons for Royal Marines. Furthermore, new vehicles such as quadbikes and ships were trialled in exercises to develop the FCF as well as novel tactics, including an increased use of deception, working in teams of reduced sizes and of different compositions, and operating with greater agility and autonomy.

The FCF is being developed in exercises; see the history section below for a detailed timeline. There have been numerous reports that there is not currently sufficient funding for the programme to be successful. In addition to this, it has been estimated the FCF would have ~4,000 Royal Marines personnel from the existing force of ~7,000.

Structure

The FCF is to form around the LRGs, specialised Royal Navy task groups that provide rapid strike capabilities in littoral zones and to counter grey zone and sub-threshold activity. They will be LRG(North), based in Europe and responsible for the Atlantic, Baltic, Arctic Ocean, and Mediterranean (i.e. north of the Suez Canal), and LRG(South), based in Oman and responsible for the Indo-Pacific and Persian Gulf (i.e. south of the Suez). The LRGs are the implementation of the Navy's Littoral Strike concept.

45 Commando and 40 Commando will each contribute a company to form LRG(North) and LRG(South), respectively, in the form of new Strike Companies in the FCF - hence the name of the Vanguard Strike Company which tested FCF concepts in exercises. Furthermore, the structure of the FCF was outlined in evidence given to the House of Commons Defence Committee report We're going to need a bigger Navy as part of its inquiry The Navy: purpose and procurement:

Bay-class landing ships, however, are being upgraded and used only temporarily in place of the new Multi-Role Support Ships (MRSS) which are planned to enter service in the 2030s.

Summary

Each of the two LRGs will consist of:

 Littoral Strike Unit (LSU) of ~ 250 personnel
 Rotating "strike" company from 40 or 45 Cdo
 Supporting personnel from the rest of 3 Cdo Bde
 Albion-class Landing Platform Dock (LPD)
 Bay-class Landing Ship Dock (LSD), termed a Littoral Strike Ship (LSS)
 Type 45 destroyer escort
 Further supporting ships and vessels

History

Background

In April 2017, the First Sea Lord, Admiral Sir Philip Jones, announced that 42 Commando, one of the Commando units of 3 Commando Brigade, would become specialised in maritime operations. The Littoral Strike and FCF concepts were established sometime before 2019, being mentioned in various publications from the British government and armed forces in late 2018. Further development of both concepts was, in part, likely to help implement Boris Johnson's post-Brexit policy of "Global Britain", given the FCF's nature of forward deployment and special operations capability, the latter of which is pivotal to modern warfare.

2019

On , then-Defence Secretary Gavin Williamson described upcoming changes to the British Armed Forces, including the FCF, Littoral Strike concept, and LRGs. He also used the speech to announce plans to buy two "Littoral Strike Ships" in support of the LRGs.

In , A Company, 40 Commando, and 1 Assault Group Royal Marines carried out Exercise Commando Warrior, which trialled the use of Unmanned Aerial Systems (UASs) and Unmanned Ground Vehicles (UGVs) in support of a beach assault, and tactical operations as a whole. It involved using integrated data from both systems being monitored remotely to test the "Autonomous Advanced Force" concept.

In , it was reported that the Royal Marines would adopt the C8 SFW, already in service with UKSF, as their standard rifle. During the Autumn of 2019, the Royal Marines further trialled the FCF concept, enabling a larger conventional force from the United States Marine Corps (USMC) during the regular training Exercise Green Dagger.

2020

In , marines of 47 Commando (Raiding Group) Royal Marines and 45 Commando performed exercises including a landing with their Norwegian counterparts and their Skjold-class corvettes, which were found to suit the FCF model, ahead of Exercise Cold Response 20, as well as testing other novel equipment for the FCF in "Project EVE". The exercise was, however, cancelled due to the COVID-19 pandemic. In , marines of A Company, 40 Commando, experimented with Polaris DAGOR vehicles. The DAGOR and Polaris MRZR vehicles were both used in FCF trials.

In , parts of 47 Commando (Raiding Group) Royal Marines experimented with the use of jet suits for use in ship boarding operations and carried out Exercise Autonomous Advance Force, which used autonomous equipment to test the "Autonomous Advanced Force" concept. The Royal Marines and British Armed Forces as a whole had to adjust operations in light of the pandemic, which therefore affected the development of the FCF.

On , The Royal Navy announced it would test a new helmet camera from its MarWorks specialists and Visual Engineering. In late , it was announced the Royal Marines would be transitioning from their existing Multi-Terrain Pattern uniform to a new MultiCam uniform made by Crye Precision. The new uniform features the White Ensign on its sleeve to signify the connection of the Royal Marines to the Royal Navy for the first time as well as British commando insignia inspired by the original designs made in World War II.

In , 43 Commando Fleet Protection Group Royal Marines trialled the use of throwbots and handheld drones. On , it was reported that development on the MarWorks helmet camera was continuing and that 40 Commando were to begin testing prototypes. On , it was announced that a new Vanguard Strike Company would form to further develop the FCF concept during trials before trials in the remainder of 2020 and would deploy for the first time in 2021.

In , it was reported that marines from 40 Commando had been experimenting with potential tactics to be used in the FCF, including working in smaller teams of 4, three of which make a troop of 12. Forbes reported the Royal Marines were acquiring an AI-enabled autonomous air system as part of the FCF, aligning with the "Autonomous Advanced Force" concept. In mid-September, the Royal Navy began the Littoral Response Group (Experimentation) (LRG(X)) deployment, which aimed to test the Littoral Strike concept and experiment with tactics for future LRGs.

The LRG(X) task group reached Cyprus by the end of October, where they began experimenting with the use of drones, as part of Autonomous Advance Force 3. The marines of LRG(X) went on to experiment with drones, video links, quadbikes, jet skis, ATAK tablets, and other novel equipment during the exercises in Cyprus, including Exercise Olympus Warrior. Soon after, 43 Commando Fleet Protection Group Royal Marines continued experimentation with throwbots, RPAS, and ATAKs during Exercise Serpent Rock in Gibraltar. Marines from 45 Commando also used drones and ATAKs during training in Wales.

In early , marines from 45 Commando further tested quadbikes, using them to move mortars rapidly. On , HMS Albion and the remainder of the LRG(X) task group arrived back in the UK, finishing the deployment. Later in December, marines from C Company, 40 Commando performed deep penetration missions in the Mojave Desert with a team from United States Army Special Forces working against an opposing force from the USMC and worked in 12-man teams to further experiment with the FCF concept.

2021

In early March, it was reported that marines from A company, 40 Commando, were experimenting with Virtual Reality (VR) technology to augment existing training methods. Soon after, marines from 45 Commando experimented further with Small unit tactics in Norway. On , Forces News reported that the Vanguard Strike Company, from marines of 40 Commando, had been performing exercises including night-time shooting and experimenting with working in 12-man teams. The latter further described the FCF and Littoral strike concepts and LRGs in greater detail, announced £200 million would be invested into the FCF over the following decade, and, being a command paper, reinforces that they will continue to be developed to completion.

Between May and June, the FCF and LRG concepts were further developed during the Littoral Response Group (North) deployment to Scotland, Norway, and the Baltic.

Later in May, members of 29th Commando Regiment Royal Artillery and 148 (Meiktila) Battery Royal Artillery carried out Exercise Fleet Battle Problem, in which it was examined how artillery fire and airstrikes could be coordinated within the FCF. In late May, the Commando Logistic Regiment carried out Exercise Green Dragon to better understand how members of the FCF would remain supplied on operations.

In July, marines of 40 Commando and 42 Commando performed mock raids using drone "swarms", used to resupply the marines, for the first time as part of Autonomous Advance Force 4.0. Later in July, marines from 40 Commando continued trials of the Polaris MRZR, with potential use to transport "light strike teams". Further, marines from B Company, 40 Commando, took part in Exercise Talisman Sabre in Australia, where they continued to practice working in 12-man teams and with drones as they acted as an advance force ahead of the main landings.

Ending in late September, Exercise Dynamic Mariner 21/Joint Warrior 21-2, which saw HMS Prince of Wales being declared fully operational, involved FCF development. In late October, marines from 40 Commando took part in Exercise Green Dagger alongside the USMC, in which they used FCF tactics and explored how small commando teams would be resupplied, as part of the recently created Littoral Response Group (South) of the LRGs. It was reported that the USMC suffered a severe "defeat" to the Royal Marines, however, this is disputed and remains unclear. During the exercise, marines were pictured using the novel NightFighter X counter-UAV system.

In December, a publication from the House of Commons Defence Committee, following its inquiry into the Royal Navy as a whole, expressed concern at insufficient funding for the FCF: "we are concerned that the Future Commando Force and the Littoral Response Groups are not properly resourced to continue amphibious operations". An October publication from King's College London's Centre for Defence Studies detailed how the FCF, if replacing the existing formation of the Royal Marines altogether, would represent a cut in personnel of ~43%: "...if this entails a reduction in size, it also entails a reduction of the one UK force designed explicitly to be expeditionary...".

2022

In February 2022, a troop of new Royal Marines recruits passed training having been exposed to and trained in novel FCF tactics and concepts. Later in February, a report published from the National Audit Office found that "the New Medium Helicopter and Future Commando Force programmes ... are currently underfunded". This added to other reports of underfunding of the FCF programme, as well as other initiatives from the Integrated Review. The government later responded to the National Audit Office, restating the commitment to the FCF and creating LRGs, mentioning investments made into the initiatives and planned upgrades to ships.

It was reported that FCF tactics during Exercise Cold Response 2022, which took place from March to April. In , Brigadier Mark Totten OBE, the director of the FCF programme, described how the FCF would be made up of ~4,000 marines, focus on both the Arctic and Suez Canal areas, and would work alongside the Navy's UK Carrier Strike Group.

See also

 Royal Marines
 Littoral Response Groups
 Defence in a Competitive Age

References

External links 

 Watch: What is the Future Commando Force? 
 Future Commando Force
 Thoughts on the Future Commando Force
 Royal Marines to form new commando force in armed forces shake-up
 Sunset of the Royal Marines; Sunrise of the Future Commando Force.
 Reconciling the Old with the New: FCF and the Integrated Review
 The Heavy Weapons Specialisation is the key to the Future Commando Force.

Royal Marines personnel